Chandmukh is a village located in Bansihari subdivision of Dakshin Dinajpur district in West Bengal, India. The postal code of the village is 733121.

Location 
It is situated 4.2 km away from sub-district headquarter Buniadpur. Balurghat is the district headquarter of this village. Brajaballavpur is the gram panchayat of this village. The total geographical area of the village is 139.68 hectares or 1.3968 km2. The village code of this village is 311740.

Population 
With about 271 houses this village has a total population of 1,242 people amongst them are 625 male and 625 female and a total geographical area of 139.68 hectares or 1.3968 km2.

Education 

 Chandmukh F.P. School, established in 1971 and it is managed by the Department of Education.

See also 

 Dahuakuri, village in Dakshin Dinajpur.
 Rangapukur, village in Dakshin Dinajpur.

References 

Villages in Dakshin Dinajpur district